This is a list of the largest Eastern Orthodox church buildings in the world, based on area and capacity. Any Eastern Orthodox church building that has a capacity of 3,000 people or more, can be added to this page. Entries are included even if they currently do not function as a church. For example, the Hagia Sophia is included – it was originally built as a church but was later converted into a mosque. Sorting is done by volume (priority) and area. The church building are listed in alphabetical order according to country. The churches are from various jurisdictions of the Eastern Orthodox Church.

List

See also
List of tallest Eastern Orthodox church buildings
List of largest church buildings
List of tallest domes
Lists of cathedrals
List of Greek Orthodox churches in the United States
List of Russian Orthodox churches

Footnotes

References

Eastern Orthodoxy-related lists
Orth
Orth
 
Orthodox
Oriental Orthodoxy-related lists
Eastern Orthodox church buildings, Largest
Church, Eastern Orthodox